Geoffrey Hutchings (8 June 1939 – 1 July 2010) was an English stage, film and television actor.

Early life and career
Hutchings was born in Dorchester, Dorset, England. After attending Hardye's School, he studied French and Physical Education at Birmingham University before attending the Royal Academy of Dramatic Art and later joining the Royal Shakespeare Company in 1968.

Career

Stage
With the RSC from 1968 until the 1980s Hutchings played many roles in Shakespeare including Launce, Octavius Caesar and Pandar.  He played Bosola in the 1971 RSC production of John Webster's The Duchess of Malfi. Hutchings made his name particularly in Shakespeare's comic roles including Dromio of Syracuse, Bottom, Feste, Lavache, Autolycus and Doctor Caius. Hutchings' singing voice often featured in his comic roles, with his appearance in 1982 as Lady Dodo in the musical Poppy winning a Laurence Olivier Award for Best Comedy Performance.

In 1998, he played Carry On actor Sid James in the Royal National Theatre's production of Terry Johnson's stage play Cleo, Camping, Emmanuelle and Dick, a behind-the-scenes look at the love affair between Sid James and his co-star Barbara Windsor, which was subsequently made into an ITV drama called Cor, Blimey! in 2000. In 2004, he played Nagg in Samuel Beckett's Endgame at the Albery Theatre alongside Sir Michael Gambon, Lee Evans and Liz Smith. From October 2006 to April 2007, he played Herr Schultz in the West End production of Cabaret. His final stage role was in 2009 in the West End production of The Shawshank Redemption.

Film and TV
In 1980, Hutchings starred as a character called Trunky Porter in the TV series Juliet Bravo.

In 1987, Hutchings played Harry Stobbs in Series 3, episode 4 of The Bill.

A first collaboration with David Leland for the film Made in Britain (directed by Alan Clarke and starring Tim Roth) in 1981 has led to his notable role as Hubert Mansell, the father of Emily Lloyd in Wish You Were Here in 1987.

His other film successes included White Hunter, Black Heart (with Clint Eastwood), Henry V (with Kenneth Branagh), Topsy-Turvy (with Jim Broadbent), Clockwise (with John Cleese), The Thief Lord (as Conte) and The Affair of the Necklace (with Hilary Swank).

On television, his most notable role has probably been in Our Friends in the North (1996), in which he played corrupt building contractor John Edwards, a character closely based on the real-life figure of John Poulson. He also had a semi-regular role as Bobby Hollamby in the ITV prison drama Bad Girls from 2000 to 2003. Earlier, he had played second fiddle to Michael Gambon in 12 episodes of Maigret in 1992–1993. He also narrated several audiobooks based on Georges Simenon's Maigret stories. 
In 2005 he played Lionel Morris in ITV's Heartbeat. Series 14 episode 23 Shadows from the Past. In 2007, Hutchings made a guest appearance in ITV drama Wild at Heart.

In December 2006, he made an appearance in the Sky One television adaptation of Terry Pratchett's Hogfather. From 2008 to 2009, he appeared in the ITV comedy series Benidorm as Mel Harvey and had a small role in the second Terry Pratchett adaptation Terry Pratchett's The Colour of Magic.
 
In February 2009, he appeared in EastEnders as Roger Clarke, Jane and Christian's father and in the BBC film Nativity!.

In 2010 he appeared in the BBC medical drama Casualty and the sitcom Grandma's House, both of which were screened after his death.

He was a regular as Mel Harvey, the owner of five sunbed shops in the Greater Manchester area in Benidorm, an ITV sitcom about British holidaymakers in Spain; appearing in Series 2 (2008), Series 3 (2009) and a 2009 Special. But his sudden death just before the shooting of the 2010 Christmas Special meant that the script had to be heavily rewritten, with his death said to have occurred off-screen on a business trip abroad.

Death
Hutchings died suddenly, in hospital, on the morning of 1 July 2010. The cause of death was meningitis. He was surrounded by his family; second wife Andi Godfrey, and the three children of his first marriage: one son (Nathan Hutchings) and two daughters (Octavia Hutchings and Holly Hutchings).
He was cremated at Kensal Green Cemetery, Kensal Green, West London.

Selected filmography

References

External links

1939 births
2010 deaths
Alumni of RADA
Alumni of the University of Birmingham
English male film actors
English male soap opera actors
English male stage actors
Infectious disease deaths in England
Laurence Olivier Award winners
People from Dorchester, Dorset
Royal Shakespeare Company members
People educated at Hardye's School